Chad Edward Alesna Gould (born September 30, 1982) is a Filipino former footballer who played as a central defender or striker for the Loyola Meralco Sparks and the Philippines national team. He is currently a music artist signed by Warner Music Philippines. In December 2021, his song ‘Daisy’ was played on BBC Music Introducing Show.

Honours

Club
Loyola Meralco Sparks
 United Football League Cup: 2013

Early life and education
Gould was born on 30 September 1982 in Cebu City, Philippines and grew up in England.

He studied at Brunel University where he obtained a degree in sports science.

Football career

Youth
He spent his youth career with Bournemouth and Southampton.

Club
He was part of the reserves team of AFC Wimbledon during the 2007–08 season making reserve league appearances and a single reserve cup appearance. He scored four goals for the reserve team. He left the club on 22 September 2008.

In 2012, he joined the Loyola Meralco Sparks F.C. of the United Football League. With the club, Gould won the 2013 UFL Cup. He was also part of Loyola's squad that participated in the 2013 Menpora Cup in Indonesia. He left Loyola after two seasons.

Chad is currently a free agent.

International
Gould first appeared for the Philippines in the 2004 Tiger Cup, playing in two matches.  His debut came in the 4–1 defeat to Malaysia where he scored the Philippines' only goal.

In 2006, Gould took a break from football, but returned to the national team in 2008 play until 2010.

He was later selected to play for the England national beach soccer team after he was scouted playing in a tournament organised by Nuts magazine.

International goals
Scores and results list the Philippines' goal tally first.

Current
Since January 2017, Gould has been working as football coach. He is also currently a recording music artist. In June 2020, Gould signed a three year deal with Warner Music Group in the Philippines.

References

External links

1982 births
Living people
English people of Filipino descent
British Asian footballers
Citizens of the Philippines through descent
Filipino British sportspeople
Filipino footballers
Filipino expatriate footballers
Association football forwards
Philippines international footballers
AFC Wimbledon players
English pop singers
Filipino people of English descent
F.C. Meralco Manila players
Alumni of Brunel University London
English beach soccer players
Sportspeople from Cebu City
Musicians from Cebu